WNDY may refer to:

 WNDY-TV, a television station (channel 23 analog/32 digital) licensed to Marion, Indiana, United States
 WNDY (FM), a radio station (91.3 FM) licensed to Crawfordsville, Indiana, United States
 WNDY as the fictional television station around which the short-lived WIOU was based
 WNDY as the fictional radio station in the Dolly Parton film Straight Talk